Elizabeth Jurema Faro Cailo (born 2 July 1987) is an Angolan handball player who plays for the club Primeiro de Agosto. She is member of the Angolan national team. She competed at the 2015 World Women's Handball Championship in Denmark.

References

External links
 

1987 births
Living people
Angolan female handball players
Olympic handball players of Angola
Handball players at the 2008 Summer Olympics
Place of birth missing (living people)
African Games gold medalists for Angola
African Games medalists in handball
Competitors at the 2015 African Games